Acochaca or Aquchaka (Quechua aqu sand, chaka bridge, "sand bridge") is one of two districts of the province Asunción in Peru.

Ethnic groups 
The people in the district are mainly indigenous citizens of Quechua descent. Quechua is the language which the majority of the population (92.67%) learnt to speak in childhood, 6.99% of the residents started speaking using the Spanish language (2007 Peru Census).

See also 
 Ancash Quechua

References

External links
  Municipal web site

Districts of the Asunción Province
Districts of the Ancash Region